Luís Correia is one of the four coastal cities of Piauí, Brazil.

The municipality contains part of the  Delta do Parnaíba Environmental Protection Area, created in 1996.
The municipality also contains part of the  Serra da Ibiapaba Environmental Protection Area, created in 1996.

References 

Populated places established in 1938
Populated coastal places in Piaúi
Municipalities in Piauí